MakeMyTrip is an Indian online travel company founded in 2000. Headquartered in Gurugram, Haryana, its a company. the company provides online travel services including airline tickets, domestic and international holiday packages, hotel reservations, rail, and bus tickets. As of 31 March 2018, they have 14 company-owned travel stores in 14 cities, over 30 franchisee-owned travel stores in 28 cities, and counters in four major airports in India. MakeMyTrip has also numerous international offices in New York, Singapore, Kuala Lumpur, Phuket, Bangkok, and Dubai.

History 

 2000: MakeMyTrip was founded by Deep Kalra, an alumnus of IIM-Ahmedabad. It was launched in US market in the year 2000 to cater to the overseas Indian community for their US to India travel needs. 
 2005 – September: MakeMyTrip started Indian operations in September 2005, offering online flight tickets to Indian travellers. The company also started to focus on non-air businesses like holiday packages and hotel bookings.
 2010 – September 17: On 17 August 2010, MakeMyTrip Limited was listed on the NASDAQ after its initial public offering.
 2011: In 2011, the company created some travel related apps for mobile devices. MakeMyTrip also made three acquisitions—Luxury Tours and Travel Private Limited (Singapore), ITC Group Hotel Travel Group, and ETB Group—to enter new markets in Southeast Asia and Europe. In September 2014, MakeMyTrip instituted a $15 million innovation fund to support travel start-ups.
 2015 – April: MakeMyTrip acquired MyGola, a travel planning website, in April 2015. The acquisition was done through the innovation fund, and all employees of MyGola were absorbed into the MakeMyTrip team.
 2015 – July: In July 2015, MakeMyTrip invested in the travel information and hotel review portal HolidayIQ and picked up approximately 30% stake in the company. In the same month, it invested $5 million in Bona Vita Technologies, a start-up which plans to utilise the funds to build innovative products in the travel industry.
 2016 – January: In January 2016, the Chinese travel booking company Ctrip agreed to invest $180 million in MakeMyTrip.
 As of March 31, 2018, the company has 14 company-owned travel stores in 14 cities, including one in their office in Gurugram, over 30 franchisee-owned travel stores which primarily sell packages in approximately 28 cities, and counters in four major airports in India under their brand. They also have offices in New York, Singapore, Kuala Lumpur, Phuket, Bangkok, and Dubai.
2021 – May: the company entered into a strategic partnership with the digital payment arm of Amazon⁣—⁣Amazon Pay for providing travel services on Amazon.
2022 – November: the company plans to enhance business-to-business segment.

Mergers, acquisitions and investments

MakeMyTrip and Ibibo Group merger
In 2016, MakeMyTrip and Ibibo Group, India's largest travel booking portals, merged through a stock transaction. Through this transaction, MakeMyTrip acquired its rival, Ibibo Group, in one of the biggest acquisition in India's online travel space. Post merger, MakeMyTrip shareholders own a 60% stake and Ibibo Group shareholders get a 40% stake. Naspers and Tencent, who jointly owned Ibibo Group, became the single largest shareholder in MakeMyTrip.

Products and services 
MakeMyTrip offers flight tickets to many, villas and apartments, rail and bus tickets, cab service, and hotel booking services on its portal. In 2012, MakeMyTrip launched travel mobile applications for Windows Phone, iPhone, Android, and Blackberry devices. MakeMyTrip route planner provides all the basic required information on more than 10 lakh (1 million) routes in India.  MakeMyTrip also offer metro train tickets for Hyderabad Metro.

The Organization has also undertaken certain steps to make travelling stress-free, appropriate and pliable.

Awards and recognition

References

External links
 

Indian travel websites
Travel ticket search engines
Indian companies established in 2000
Transport companies established in 2000
Internet properties established in 2000
2010 initial public offerings
Online travel agencies
Companies based in Gurgaon
Companies listed on the Nasdaq
2000 establishments in Haryana
Travel and holiday companies of India